James A. Horne was an American politician. He served as Secretary of State of Mississippi from 1852 to 1854.

Horne lived in Winchester, Mississippi.

References

Secretaries of State of Mississippi
19th-century American politicians
Year of birth missing
Year of death missing